The A104 Autoroute is a French autoroute linking Gonesse (Val-d'Oise) and Collégien (Seine-et-Marne).

Exits and Junctions

A104